Capers (German: Capriolen) is a 1937 German comedy film directed by and starring Gustaf Gründgens and also featuring Marianne Hoppe, Fita Benkhoff and Volker von Collande. It was shot at the Johannisthal Studios in Berlin. The film's sets were designed by the art directors Kurt Herlth and Werner Schlichting. It was produced and released by Terra Film while international distribution was handled by Tobis Film.

Synopsis
Celebrated journalist Jack Warren is tired of interviewing self-regarding famous woman. When he encounters the actress Dorothy Hopkins, he mistakes her for the famous aviatrix Mabel Atkinson and in turn mistakes the real Mabel for somebody else.

Cast
 Marianne Hoppe as 	Mabel Atkinson
 Gustaf Gründgens as Jack Warren
 Fita Benkhoff as Peggy MacFarland
 Maria Bard as Dorothy Hopkins
 Volker von Collande as 	William Baxter 
 Hans Leibelt as 	Neville
 Franz Weber as 	Simpson
 Max Gülstorff as 	Rechtsanwalt
 Paul Henckels as Rechtsanwalt
 Albert Florath as Der Richter
 Elsa Wagner as 	Dame beim Zahnarzt
 Eva Tinschmann as Zimmervermieterin
 Erich Dunskus as 	Schornsteinfeger
 Otto Graf as Zahnarzt
 Walter Gross as 	Bildberichterstatter
 Clemens Hasse as 	Funker
 Erika Streithorst as 	Assistantin
 Ernst Behmer as 	Pfarrer
 Wolf Trutz as 	Herr beim Zahnarzt

References

Bibliography 
 Bock, Hans-Michael & Bergfelder, Tim. The Concise CineGraph. Encyclopedia of German Cinema. Berghahn Books, 2009.
 Hake, Sabine. German National Cinema. Routledge, 2002.
 Loacker, Armin.  Willi Forst: ein Filmstil aus Wien. Filmarchiv Austria, 2003.
 Rentschler, Eric. The Ministry of Illusion: Nazi Cinema and Its Afterlife. Harvard University Press, 1996.

External links 
 

1937 films
Films of Nazi Germany
1930s German-language films
Films directed by Gustaf Gründgens
1930s German films
German comedy films
1937 comedy films
Terra Film films
Films shot at Johannisthal Studios

de:Kapriolen